Medford branch may refer to:

 Medford branch (Boston and Maine Railroad)
 Medford branch, Green Line Extension
 Medford branch, West Jersey and Seashore Railroad